Sanah Mollo (born 30 January 1987) is a South African soccer player who  plays as a defender for Mamelodi Sundowns and has represented the South Africa women's national football team, including at the Summer Olympics football tournaments.

Football career

Club
Sanah Mollo was born in Villiers, Free State on 30 January 1987, and began playing football at the age of nine for The Birds FC, an amateur team. Her parents initially opposed her attendance at the club but eventually became supportive. She continued to play while at high school, and was offered a sports bursary to attend the University of the Free State after playing against them. At a club level, she currently plays for Mamelodi Sundowns.

International
From a young age, Mollo wanted to play for the South Africa women's national football team, and she made her debut in 2006 in a match against Senegal. She has continued to appear in the squads for tournaments over the years, including at the 2012 and 2016 Summer Olympics. She was a member of the team that was runners-up at the 2012 African Women's Championship.

Personal
Mollo holds a marketing degree from the University of the Free State. She works full-time in customer management, working around training and taking time off during tournaments to allow her to play for South Africa. She isn't paid by her club, but is given a travel stipend, and receives some funds from the national team.

References

External links
 

1987 births
Living people
People from Mafube Local Municipality
South African Sotho people
Women's association football midfielders
South African women's soccer players
South Africa women's international soccer players
Footballers at the 2012 Summer Olympics
Footballers at the 2016 Summer Olympics
Olympic soccer players of South Africa
Soccer players from the Free State (province)